Marschacht is a municipality in the district of Harburg, in Lower Saxony, Germany. It completes the Samtgemeinde Elbmarsch with Tespe and Drage. Marschacht is only a few kilometres far away from Geesthacht. 
1216: First documentary mention of the settlement as Hachede, then a part of Saxony.
A change in the course of the Elbe cuts the settlement into two: Geesthacht (in Schleswig-Holstein) and Marschacht .

References

Harburg (district)